Nino Iobashvili (born 8 September 1984) is a Georgian politician. Since 2021, she has been a member of the Parliament of Georgia of the 10th convocation by party list, election bloc: Georgian Dream - Democratic Georgia.

References

Members of the Parliament of Georgia
1984 births
Georgian Dream politicians
Living people
21st-century politicians from Georgia (country)